The Reliance 20th Asian Junior and Cadet Table Tennis Championships 2014 were held in Mumbai, India, from  12 to 16 September 2014. It was organised by the Table Tennis Federation of India under the authority of the Asian Table Tennis Union (ATTU). It was also a qualification stage for the 2014 World Junior Table Tennis Championships.

Medal summary

Events

Medal table

See also

2014 World Junior Table Tennis Championships
Asian Table Tennis Championships
Asian Table Tennis Union

References

Asian Junior and Cadet Table Tennis Championships
Asian Junior and Cadet Table Tennis Championships
Asian Junior and Cadet Table Tennis Championships
Asian Junior and Cadet Table Tennis Championships
Table tennis competitions in India
International sports competitions hosted by India
Asian Junior and Cadet Table Tennis Championships